Rosedale is an unincorporated community in Braxton and Gilmer counties in the U.S. state of West Virginia.  It lies along the Right Fork Steer Creek, at an elevation of 778 feet (237 m).

The community was named after wild rose bushes near the original town site.

References

Unincorporated communities in West Virginia
Unincorporated communities in Braxton County, West Virginia
Unincorporated communities in Gilmer County, West Virginia